"In My Merry Oldsmobile" is a popular song from 1905, with music by Gus Edwards and lyrics by Vincent P. Bryan.

The song's chorus is one of the most enduring automobile-oriented songs. The verses, which are slightly suggestive (by 1905 standards) tell of a couple who court and fall in love during a trip with a new Oldsmobile.

Popular culture
Oldsmobile Division of General Motors used the song, with altered lyrics, for several decades as a marketing jingle.

The song was featured in the 1931 Fleischer Studios animated short In My Merry Automobile as a "follow the bouncing ball" sing-along feature. The short, directed by Jimmy Culhane, was produced "by arrangement and in cooperation with" the Olds Motor Works.

Bing Crosby featured the song in his film The Star Maker in 1939 and recorded the song for Decca Records on June 30, 1939.

"In My Merry Oldsmobile" was often used by Carl Stalling, long-time music director for Warner Bros. cartoons, especially when references to automobiles or driving were made.

"In My Merry Oldsmobile" is one of the songs played on Main Street USA in Disneyland and the Walt Disney World Magic Kingdom.

It was also sung in episode The Best Of Enemies of M*A*S*H by Hawkeye Pierce (played by Alan Alda) while driving a Jeep in Korea.

The song was also featured in the Broadway musical Tintypes.

"In My Merry Oldsmobile" is one of the songs sung by the BonziBuddy software application.

In the song "Lord, Mr. Ford" on the 1979 album Matchbox by British rockabilly band Matchbox, they cover Jerry Reed's 1973 original, and the line "Come away with me, Lucille" is repeated several times, with the addition, at the end of the song, of the line "In my smoking choking automobile." The name Lucille hit its highest number in the US register of 1902; it was highly popular and had a certain glamour at the point of the song's popularity.

Oldsmobile sponsored several TV shows starring Patti Page in the 1950s, including The Patti Page Show from 1955–56, The Big Record from 1957–58 and The Oldsmobile Show starring Patti Page from 1958–59.  "In My Merry Oldsmobile" was used as the theme song on every telecast, and Page often sang some form of it with new lyrics.  On some of the programs, the musical commercial segments were performed by Bill Hayes and Florence Henderson.

It was used as the opening and closing theme on Techdirt's Podcast Episode 28: Is Car Ownership On The Way Out?

Lyrics

The words, as sung by Billy Murray, are as follows:

Verse 1

Young Johnny Steele has an Oldsmobile
He loves his dear little girl
She is the queen of his gas machine
She has his heart in a whirl

Now when they go for a spin, you know,
She tries to learn the auto, so
He lets her steer, while he gets her ear
And whispers soft and low...

Verse 2

They love to "spark" in the dark old park
As they go flying along
She says she knows why the motor goes
The "sparker" is awfully strong

Each day they "spoon" to the engine's tune
Their honeymoon will happen soon
He'll win Lucille with his Oldsmobile
And then he'll fondly croon...

Chorus

Come away with me, Lucille
In my merry Oldsmobile
Down the road of life we'll fly
Automobubbling, you and I

To the church we'll swiftly steal
Then our wedding bells will peal
You can go as far as you like with me
In my merry Oldsmobile.

References

External links
 An early Billy Murray recording

Murray revived the old song for a "follow the bouncing ball" cartoon in the 1930s.
 In My Merry Oldsmobile (1932) at Internet Archive

1905 songs
1900s song stubs
Parlor songs
Billy Murray (singer) songs
Songs with music by Gus Edwards
Songs about cars
Oldsmobile